Cordillera Province is one of six provinces in the Santiago Metropolitan Region of central Chile. Its topography includes a small area of Chile's central valley, glaciers, rivers, volcanoes, and the Andes range, which forms the border with Mendoza Province in Argentina.

Administration
As a province, Cordillera is a second-level administrative division of Chile, governed by a provincial delegate who is appointed by the president. The current delegate is Marcela Mella Ortiz, who was appointed by President Gabriel Boric.

Communes
The province comprises three communes, each governed by a municipality consisting of an alcalde and municipal council: Pirque, Puente Alto and San José de Maipo.

Geography and demography
According to the 2002 census, Cordillera was the second most populous province in the region with a total population of 522,856. At that time, there were 511,565 people living in urban areas, 11,291 living in rural areas, 256,193 men, and 266,663 women.

Gallery

References

External links
 

Provinces of Chile
Provinces of Santiago Metropolitan Region